Wade Flaherty (born January 11, 1968) is a Canadian former professional ice hockey goaltender who has played in the National Hockey League for the San Jose Sharks, New York Islanders, Tampa Bay Lightning, Florida Panthers, and the Nashville Predators, as well as several teams in the American Hockey League and ECHL. He last played professionally for the China Sharks of the Asia League Ice Hockey, before being named the developmental goaltending coach for the Chicago Blackhawks.

Flaherty was drafted 181st overall by the Buffalo Sabres in the 1988 NHL Entry Draft. While playing with the Islanders, Flaherty was the last NHL goalie to give up a goal to Wayne Gretzky.

Flaherty backed up Curtis Joseph for Team Canada in the 2007 Spengler Cup. In 2008, he signed with the China Sharks of the Asia League Ice Hockey, being named the starting goaltender and goaltender coach. Flaherty also assisted the Chinese national team in the same capacity. In January 2009, Flaherty was named goaltending coach for the Chicago Blackhawks.

Since the 2011–12 season, Flaherty has served as the goaltending coach for the Winnipeg Jets of the NHL.

Career statistics

Transactions
 June 11, 1988 - Drafted by Buffalo Sabres in the 9th round, 181st overall.
 September 3, 1991 - Signed by the San Jose Sharks as a free agent.
 July 22, 1996 - Signed by the New York Islanders as a free agent.
 February 16, 2001 - Traded to the Tampa Bay Lightning for future considerations.
 August 2, 2001 - Signed by the Florida Panthers as a free agent.
 March 9, 2003 - Traded to the Nashville Predators for Pascal Trepanier.
 July 7, 2004 - Signed by the Vancouver Canucks as a free agent.
 July 11, 2007 - Signed by the Chicago Blackhawks as a free agent.

References

External links

1968 births
Living people
Buffalo Sabres draft picks
Canadian ice hockey goaltenders
Chicago Blackhawks coaches
China Dragon players
Florida Panthers players
Greensboro Monarchs players
Ice hockey people from British Columbia
Kalamazoo Wings (1974–2000) players
Kansas City Blades players
Kelowna Wings players
Kentucky Thoroughblades players
Manitoba Moose players
Milwaukee Admirals players
Nashville Predators players
New York Islanders players
People from Terrace, British Columbia
Rockford IceHogs (AHL) players
San Antonio Rampage players
San Jose Sharks players
Seattle Thunderbirds players
Spokane Chiefs players
Tampa Bay Lightning players
Utah Grizzlies (AHL) players
Utah Grizzlies (IHL) players
Victoria Cougars (WHL) players
Winnipeg Jets coaches
Canadian expatriate ice hockey players in China
Canadian expatriate ice hockey players in the United States
Canadian ice hockey coaches